Veli Autio (2 September 1909 – 13 August 1993) was a Finnish rower. He competed in the men's coxed four event at the 1948 Summer Olympics.

References

External links
 

1909 births
1993 deaths
Finnish male rowers
Olympic rowers of Finland
Rowers at the 1948 Summer Olympics
Place of birth missing